South Carolina Highway 909 (SC 909) is a  primary state highway in the U.S. state of South Carolina. It connects the communities of northern Chester County.

Route description

SC 909 is a two-lane rural highway that traverses from U.S. Route 321 (US 321) in Lowrys to SC 9 near Richburg. The route zig-zags in northern Chester County connecting small communities, and provides access to the Chester Catawba Regional Airport.

History

Established in 1940 as a new primary routing, it originally traversed from SC 9 to US 21 in Lewis.  In 1941 or 1942, SC 909 was extended both directions: south, from SC 9 to the Knox community, and west from US 21 and through Lowrys to Cassels Road. In 1948, SC 909 was reverted to its original 1940 with both extensions becoming secondary roads. Around 1952, it was re-extended west to its current western terminus at US 321.

Major intersections

See also

References

External links

 
 SC 909 at Virginia Highways' South Carolina Highways Annex

909
Transportation in Chester County, South Carolina